Horse Riding is an extended play by The Hiatus released on July 31, 2013. Horse Riding reached No. 10 on the Oricon chart.

Track listing

References 

2013 EPs
The Hiatus albums